Mihai Dico (born 16 August 1987) is a Romanian rugby union player. He plays in the prop position for amateur SuperLiga club Baia Mare and București based European Challenge Cup side the Wolves. He also plays for Romania's national team the Oaks.

References

External links
Mihai Dico at It'srugby

1987 births
Living people
Romanian rugby union players
Romania international rugby union players
Rugby union props
CSM Știința Baia Mare players